The 48th Directors Guild of America Awards, honoring the outstanding directorial achievements in films, documentary and television in 1995, were presented on March 2, 1996 at the Hyatt Regency Century Plaza as well as in New York. The ceremony in Los Angeles was hosted by Carl Reiner. The nominees in the feature film category were announced on January 22, 1996 and the other nominations were announced in February.

Winners and nominees

Film

Television

Commercials

D.W. Griffith Award
 Woody Allen

Lifetime Achievement in Sports Direction
 Tony Verna

Lifetime Achievement in News Direction
 Arthur Bloom

Robert B. Aldrich Service Award
 Daniel Petrie

Franklin J. Schaffner Achievement Award
 Don Lewis Barnhart

Honorary Life Member
 Chuck Jones

References

External links
 

Directors Guild of America Awards
1995 film awards
1995 television awards
1995 in American cinema
1995 in American television
Directors
1996 in Los Angeles
1996 in New York City
March 1996 events in the United States